In martingale theory, Émery topology is a topology on the space of semimartingales. The topology is used in financial mathematics. The class of stochastic integrals with general predictable integrands coincides with the closure of the set of all simple integrals.

The topology was introduced in 1979 by the french mathematician Michel Émery.

Definition 

We define the quasinorm

Then  with the metric  is a complete space and the induced topology is called Émery topology.

References 

 probability